Blue Water is a 1924 Canadian silent film directed by David Hartford and starring Pierre Gendron, Jane Thomas, and Norma Shearer. It is the last feature produced by Ernest Shipman, and is the Montreal-born, future MGM star Shearer's only Canadian film. It had a commercial release in Saint John, N.B., where it was shot, but no print is known to exist.

Cast

References

Bibliography
 Jack Jacobs & Myron Braum. The films of Norma Shearer. A. S. Barnes, 1976.

External links

1924 films
Canadian silent films
English-language Canadian films
Canadian black-and-white films
Canadian drama films
1920s Canadian films
Silent drama films